The 2018 OEC Taipei WTA Challenger was a professional tennis tournament played on indoor carpet courts. It was the 11th edition of the tournament and part of the 2018 WTA 125K series, offering a total of $125,000 in prize money. It took place in Taipei, Taiwan, on 12–18 November 2018.

Singles main draw entrants

Seeds 

 1 Rankings as of 5 November 2018.

Other entrants 
The following player received wildcards into the singles main draw:
  Joanna Garland
  Liang En-shuo
  Sabine Lisicki
  Zhang Ling
  Zheng Saisai

The following players received entry from the qualifying draw:
  Jang Su-jeong
  Tereza Martincová
  Elena-Gabriela Ruse
  Zhang Yuxuan

The following player received entry as lucky losers:
  Lizette Cabrera
  Ng Kwan-yau

Withdrawals
  Jana Čepelová → replaced by  Carol Zhao
  Margarita Gasparyan → replaced by  Lizette Cabrera
  Ekaterine Gorgodze → replaced by  Xun Fangying
  Evgeniya Rodina → replaced by  Danka Kovinić
  Katie Swan → replaced by  Ankita Raina
  Sachia Vickery → replaced by  Barbara Haas
  Zheng Saisai → replaced by  Ng Kwan-yau

Doubles entrants

Seeds 

 1 Rankings as of 5 November 2018.

Other entrants 
The following pair received a wildcard into the doubles main draw:
  Lee Ya-hsuan  /  Liang En-shuo

Champions

Singles

  Luksika Kumkhum def.  Sabine Lisicki 6–1, 6–3

Doubles

 *  Ankita Raina /  Karman Thandi def.  Olga Doroshina /  Natela Dzalamidze, 6–3, 5–7, [12–12], ret.

References

External links 
 Official website 

2018 WTA 125K series
Tennis tournaments in Taiwan
2018 in Taiwanese tennis
2018 in Taiwanese women's sport